Geochemistry, Geophysics, Geosystems is a peer-reviewed open-access scientific journal covering research in Earth and planetary processes with a focus on understanding the Earth as a system. The journal is published by Wiley on behalf of the American Geophysical Union. As of May 2022 the editor-in-chief is Claudio Faccenna (Roma Tre University and University of Texas at Austin).

Abstracting and indexing
The journal is abstracted and indexed in:

According to the Journal Citation Reports, the journal has a 2021 impact factor of 4.480.

References

External links

English-language journals
Creative Commons Attribution-licensed journals
Earth and atmospheric sciences journals
Wiley (publisher) academic journals
Monthly journals
Publications established in 2000